Joseph Felix Mari "Ace" Hotchkiss Durano (born April 3, 1970) is a Filipino politician who served as Secretary of Tourism under President Gloria Macapagal Arroyo. He was also general manager of the Philippine Tourism Authority (PTA), being appointed by Arroyo in 2008.

Political career
He also served twice as the Representative of Cebu's 5th congressional district: from 1998 to 2004 and from 2013 to 2016.

He was one of the youngest to be elected representative to the 11th congress (1998-2001). He was an Assistant Majority Floor Leader and Vice Chairman of the Committee on Trade and Industry during that time.

In the 2022 local elections, Durano challenged incumbent governor Gwendolyn Garcia for the governorship of Cebu and lost. He ran alongside incumbent vice governor Hilario Davide III as his running mate.

Controversies
Durano was convicted of graft by the Sandiganbayan over the development of the Department of Tourism 2009 wall calendar, worth PhP 2.7 million, which failed to undergo public bidding. He filed a motion for reconsideration but it was denied by the court in February 2022. The case is currently under appeal before the Supreme Court.

References

External links

Secretaries of Tourism of the Philippines
Living people
People from Cebu
Members of the House of Representatives of the Philippines from Cebu
Cebuano people
Arroyo administration cabinet members
Filipino politicians convicted of crimes
Filipino politicians convicted of corruption
1970 births